The South African shelduck or Cape shelduck (Tadorna cana) is a species of shelduck, a group of large goose-like birds which are part of the bird family Anatidae, which also includes the swans, geese and ducks. This is a common species native to southern Africa.

In the austral winter, many birds move north-east from the breeding range to favoured moulting grounds, where sizable concentrations occur.

This species is mainly associated with lakes and rivers in fairly open country, breeding in disused mammal holes, usually those of the aardvark. Pairs tend to be very nomadic when not in breeding season.

Taxonomy
The South African shelduck was formally described in 1789 by the German naturalist Johann Friedrich Gmelin in his revised and expanded edition of Carl Linnaeus's Systema Naturae. He placed it with all the other geese, ducks and swans in the genus Anas and coined the binomial name Anas cana. Gmelin based his description on the "Grey-headed goose" from the Cape of Good Hope that the English ornithologist John Latham had described in 1785 in his A General Synopsis of Birds. The South African shelduck is now placed with five other species in the genus Tadorna that was introduced by the German zoologist Friedrich Boie in 1822. The genus name comes from the French name Tadorne for the common shelduck. The specific epithet cana is from Latin canus meaning "grey". The species is monotypic: no subspecies are recognised.

Description
Adult South African shelducks have ruddy bodies and wings strikingly marked with black, white and green. The male has a grey head, and the female has a white face and black crown, nape and neck sides. Note the colour on the females head is highly variable. In flight they can be hard to distinguish from Egyptian geese. Juveniles are duller in appearance. Young females lack the white on the head, excluding white eye circles. Males make a deep honk or hoogh call while the female tends to produce a louder, sharper hark.

South African shelduck is one of the species to which the Agreement on the Conservation of African-Eurasian Migratory Waterbirds (AEWA) applies.

References

 Ian Sinclair, Phil Hockey and Warwick Tarboton, SASOL Birds of Southern Africa (Struik 2002) 
 Madge and Burn, Wildfowl

External links

 Species text in The Atlas of Southern African Birds.

Tadorna
Birds of Southern Africa
Birds described in 1789
Taxa named by Johann Friedrich Gmelin